Toni Maalouf is a Lebanese actor.

Filmography

Film
Eddis Kfeefan - Father Hardini. 1998
Charbel: The Movie - Father Hardini. 2009
Rafka - Father Hardini
In the Shadow of the City - طيف المدينة - Nadim. 2000
House of Saddam - HBO-BBC Mini Series - Ahmad. 2008

Television
Hotel Al Afrah. 2012
Familia - Tarek
Hikayat Amal. - Habib. 2001
Fares el Ahlam - Imad
Attaer el Maksour - Ihab
Iza el Ard Mdawwara
Ismouha La
Malih ya Baher
Al Shahroura - Romio Lahoud

Theater 
Hake Rjeil

Dubbing roles
Brother Bear - Tuck (Egyptian dialect version)
Brother Bear 2 - Tuck (Egyptian dialect version)
Kung Fu Panda - Po
M.I. High - Kenneth Armstrong Flatley (one of his voices)
Madagascar - Alex
Teletubbies - Narrator

References 
 General
https://www.linkedin.com/in/tonimaalouf
http://www.imdb.com/name/nm3118309/
http://telive.net/Media/Person/221728/طوني-معلوف
http://www.elcinema.com/person/1100576
http://www.elfilm.com/name/2233723
http://www.tonimaalouf.com
https://www.youtube.com/tonimaalouf

 Specific

External links

Living people
Lebanese male actors
Lebanese male voice actors
21st-century Lebanese male actors
Lebanese male television actors
Year of birth missing (living people)